Casares is a surname. Notable people with the surname include:

Adolfo Bioy Casares (1914–1999), Argentine fiction writer
Ana Casares (died 2007), Polish-American actress
Carlos Casares (governor) (1830–1883), Argentine rancher, executive, and politician
Carlos Casares (writer) (1941–2002), Spanish Galician language writer
Daniel Casares (born 1980), Spanish flamenco guitarist and composer
María Casares (1922–1996), French actress, daughter of Santiago Casares Quiroga
Olga Casares Pearson (1896–1980), Argentine actress
Orlando Casares, Argentine football coach
Oscar Casares (born 1964). American writer and professor of creative writing
Rick Casares (1931–2013), American footballer
Roberto Casares (born 1964), Spanish table tennis player
Santiago Casares Quiroga (1884–1950), Spanish politician who was Prime Minister of Spain when the Civil War broke out
Viola Casares (born 1944), Mexican labor activist 
Wenceslao Casares (born 1974), Argentine businessman